Doriopsilla fulva is a species of dorid nudibranch, a sea slug, a shell-less marine gastropod mollusk in the family Dendrodorididae.

Distribution
This species is found from Point Loma, San Diego to Humboldt County California.

Description
This nudibranch can grow as large as 33 mm. It is pale yellow in colour, with dots of opaque white on the tips of the dorsal tubercles but not between the tubercles. The rhinophores have 10-12 lamellae and a pale yellow club with a white stalk. The gills are white with five pinnae. It has frequently been confused with Doriopsilla albopunctata and several other species which form a pseudocryptic species complex.

Life habits
Doriopsilla fulva eats sponges.

References

Dendrodorididae
Gastropods described in 1905